Sir Emerson Crawford Herdman KBE (2 January 1869 – 10 February 1949) was a unionist politician in Northern Ireland.

Herdman studied at Uppingham School and the University of Oxford before becoming the director of a linen company in Northern Ireland.  From 1920 to 1922, he served as Lord Lieutenant of Donegal, and he was knighted in 1921.  He was elected as a member of the Senate of Northern Ireland in 1923 and served until his death in 1949.

At the start of World War II, Herdman spoke to Éamon de Valera about obtaining "unity of command" and to ask if Éire would enter the war in return for an end to partition.  Herdman appears to have been acting on behalf of Craigavon, but de Valera rebuffed him.

References
HERDMAN, Major Sir Emerson Crawford, Who Was Who, A & C Black, 1920–2015; online edn, Oxford University Press, 2014

External links
 

1869 births
1949 deaths
Alumni of Christ Church, Oxford
Lord-Lieutenants of Donegal
Members of the Senate of Northern Ireland 1921–1925
Members of the Senate of Northern Ireland 1925–1929
Members of the Senate of Northern Ireland 1929–1933
Members of the Senate of Northern Ireland 1933–1937
Members of the Senate of Northern Ireland 1937–1941
Members of the Senate of Northern Ireland 1941–1945
Members of the Senate of Northern Ireland 1945–1949
People educated at Uppingham School
Ulster Unionist Party members of the Senate of Northern Ireland
Knights Commander of the Order of the British Empire